The Chicago Water Tower is a contributing property and landmark in the Old Chicago Water Tower District in Chicago, Illinois, United States, that is listed on the National Register of Historic Places.  Built to enclose the tall machinery of a powerful water pump in 1869, it became particularly well known when it survived the Great Chicago Fire of 1871, although the area around it was burnt to the ground.

Description
The tower is located at 806 North Michigan Avenue along the Magnificent Mile shopping district in the Near North Side community area of Chicago, Illinois in a small park, the Jane M. Byrne Plaza.  The tower was constructed to house a large water pump, intended to draw water from Lake Michigan. Built in 1869, it is the second-oldest water tower in the United States, after the Louisville Water Tower in Louisville, Kentucky.

The Chicago Water Tower now serves as a Chicago Office of Tourism as a small art gallery known as the City Gallery in the Historic Water Tower. It features the work of local photographers, artists and filmmakers.

History

The tower, built in 1869 by architect William W. Boyington from yellowing Lemont limestone, is 182.5 feet (55 m) tall. Inside was a 138-foot (42 m) high standpipe to hold water. In addition to being used for firefighting, the pressure in the pipe could be regulated to control water surges in the area. Together with the adjacent Chicago Avenue Pumping Station, it drew clean water from water cribs in Lake Michigan.

The tower gained prominence after the Great Chicago Fire of 1871. The tower was the only public building in the burned zone to survive, and is one of just a few of the surviving structures still standing. A few other buildings in the burned district did survive along with the tower. 

Ironically, the pumping station stopped working during the fire. The roof, not made of limestone, caught fire and the pumps stopped working, stopped supplying water to fight the fire. “Many Chicagoans know that the Water Tower survived the fire. During the blaze, the roof caught fire and collapsed into the pumps, destroying them, along with any hope that there would be enough water to stop the spread of the fire. But the structure itself survived.”

In the years since the fire, the tower has become a symbol of old Chicago and of the city's recovery from the fire. In 1918, when Pine Street was widened, the plans were altered in order to give the Water Tower a featured location in the city.

The tower has undergone two renovations. The first took place during a three-year period, 1913–1916. At that time many of the limestone blocks were replaced. The second renovation occurred in 1978. This renovation consisted mostly of interior changes with only minor changes made to the exterior of the building.  In 2014, the small park the tower is sited in was named for former Chicago mayor Jane Byrne.

The structure has not been universally admired. Oscar Wilde said it looked like "a castellated monstrosity with pepper boxes stuck all over it," although he did admire the arrangement and movement of the pumping machinery inside. The Water Tower's castle-like style inspired the design of some White Castle restaurant buildings. The Tower was named an American Water Landmark in 1969. In 2004 and 2017, the tower was featured in the finales of The Amazing Race 6 and The Amazing Race 29 respectively.

See also

 Architecture of Chicago
 National Register of Historic Places listings in Central Chicago
 Water Tower Place

References

External links

 City Gallery in the Historic Water Tower—City of Chicago

1869 establishments in Illinois
Art museums and galleries in Chicago
Buildings and structures in Chicago
Government buildings on the National Register of Historic Places in Chicago
Historic district contributing properties in Illinois
Industrial buildings and structures on the National Register of Historic Places in Chicago
Towers completed in 1869
Water towers in Illinois
Water towers on the National Register of Historic Places in Illinois